La Font de la Figuera is a municipality in the comarca of Costera in the Province of Valencia  in the Valencian Community, Spain.

The town is famous for its Christmas tradition in which people run through the streets in red underwear.

References

External links
La Font de la Figuera Town Hall site

Font de la Figuera, La
Font de la Figuera, La